WHNM (1350 AM) is a broadcast radio station licensed to Laconia, New Hampshire, serving the Lakes Region, including Laconia and Franklin. The station's programming is also carried on FM translator W277DJ (103.3). WHNM is owned by Patrick Costa, through license Costa-Eagle Radio Ventures Limited Partnership.

History
WHNM traces its origins to New Hampshire's first broadcast radio station, WKAV, an experimental station run by a local radio club, which went on the air in 1922 but went dark about a decade later after a myriad of financial problems. In 1934, the station was reborn as WLNH at 1310 kHz on the AM dial, moving to 1340 in 1941 and to the current 1350 frequency in 1954.

The station would change to WKZU in 1983 and WMRS in 1985, before returning to WLNH in 1987 and becoming WEZS in June 1994. As WEZS, the station initially featured a beautiful music/easy listening format, which was eventually modified to smooth jazz. WEZS was a rare AM station to play smooth jazz, along with WCIN in Cincinnati, Ohio.

The station's format changed in March 2008 to "Good Times and Great Oldies", then in December 2012 to full-time news and talk. The programming included syndicated shows hosted by Mark Levin, Tom Sullivan, Dennis Prager, and Dave Ramsey; and hourly news by Fox News Radio.

WEZS began an FM simulcast on translator W277DJ 103.3 in June 2018.

According to North East Radio Watch, in January 2023, the station changed its call letters to WHNM on January 14 and nickname to "The Moose 103.3", with a classic hits format. The changes were associated with the sale of the station and its translator by Gary W. Hammond to Patrick Costa's Costa-Eagle Radio Ventures Limited Partnership. The sale was consummated on January 25, 2023, at a price of $225,000.

References

External links
WHNM website

HNM
Radio stations established in 1934
Laconia, New Hampshire
Belknap County, New Hampshire
Classic hits radio stations in the United States
1934 establishments in New Hampshire